Geechee Recollections is an album by the American jazz saxophonist Marion Brown recorded in 1973 and released on the Impulse! label. Along with Afternoon of a Georgia Faun and Sweet Earth Flying, it was one of Brown's albums dedicated to the US state of Georgia. The Geechee of the title are a distinct African-American cultural group living in costal regions of Georgia and North Carolina.

Reception
The Allmusic reviewer Brian Olewnick awarded the album 4 stars, writing, "Brown receives excellent support by a strong ensemble including trumpeter Leo Smith and the great drummer Steve McCall. Brown, with his marvelously limpid tone on alto, is a joy to hear and seems more at home and relaxed here than on some of his more strident early records. Recommended". The New York Times described his trio of Georgia-related albums as "his most notable recordings".

Track listing

Personnel
 Marion Brown — alto saxophone, soprano saxophone, clarinet, percussion 
 Leo Smith — brass, strings, percussion
 William Malone — thumb piano, autoharp
 James Jefferson — double bass, cello, percussion
 Steve McCall — drums, percussion
 A. Kobena Adzenyah — drums, African percussion
 Jumma Santos — congas, miscellaneous instruments
 Bill Hasson — percussion, narration

References

Impulse! Records albums
Marion Brown albums
1973 albums